"4am" is a song by Canadian alternative rock band Our Lady Peace. It was released in December 1997 as the fourth single from their second album Clumsy.
The band has described the title of the song as having a double meaning. The band wrote the entire song at 4 am. Also, the band's lead vocalist's father's name was Anthony Maida. The song being written at 4am and the initials of Raine's father give meaning to the song's name. Raine has confessed that the song was triggered by a dream about his father. The dream was about their relationship and the fear he had about his father supporting his musical career. The meaning has resonated with many of the band's fans. The song has a steady upbeat tempo throughout, with poetic lyrics.

Content

According to Setlist.fm, the song "4am" was first played live in concert by Our Lady Peace on January 30, 1995 at University of New Brunswick, Fredericton, NB, Canada. It was song number 13 on the set list that night. The song "4am" was most recently played in the Tour Across Canada and was the eleventh song on their set list before the encore was played on March 27, 2018. Between 1995 and now the song has been played live nearly 500 times by at least 3 different artists. In 2006, the band released the album "A Decade" which featured hit singles including the fan favorite 4am.

Critical reception
The song 4am made the band very popular in North America and ultimately helped them win two Juno Awards. It also helped propel the album "Clumsy" to platinum status. The song was reviewed negatively by Billboard Magazine who said, "To warrant a snail-paced tempo, a song should ideally deliver pleasing vocals or poetic lyrics, and this overwrought ballad by Our Lady Peace unfortunately does neither."

Music video
The music video was directed by Tony Pantages and was filmed in Los Angeles during El Niño. In the video, the band is shown riding in a black 1958 Cadillac Series 75 limousine. There is also an edited version of the video made for airing in the U.S. The edited version is similar to the original, except it is shorter and features different camera shots at different times than the original. For example, in the original, Maida sings the majority of the song in the car, while in the edited version, he sings mostly on an empty street.

Track listing

US promo single
CSK 41071
"Radio Edit" – 3:30
"Album Version" – 4:15
"Callout Hook #1" – :10
"Callout Hook #2" – :05

Chart performance

References

External links

4am song lyrics

1997 singles
Our Lady Peace songs
Songs written by Raine Maida
1997 songs
Songs written by Arnold Lanni
Columbia Records singles